Tomb Raider is a media franchise consisting of action-adventure games, comic books, novels, theme park rides, and films, centring on the adventures of the female fictional British archaeologist Lara Croft. Since the release of the original Tomb Raider in 1996, the series developed into a franchise of the same name, and Lara went on to become a major icon of the video game industry. The Guinness Book of World Records has recognised Lara Croft as the "Most Successful Human Videogame Heroine" in 2006. Six games in the series were developed by Core Design, and the latest four by Crystal Dynamics. The games were first published by Eidos Interactive; Eidos became part of Square Enix in April 2009. Embracer Group owns the rights to the Tomb Raider trademark and characters of the franchise. Three films were released: Lara Croft: Tomb Raider, Lara Croft: Tomb Raider – The Cradle of Life and Tomb Raider. The first two star American actress Angelina Jolie as Lara Croft, and the third Swedish actress Alicia Vikander.

The Tomb Raider video games have together sold over 95 million units, making it one of the best-selling video game series of all time.

Overview

Video games

Main series

Mobile and spin-off games
These games are not part of the main series as they are either handheld, mobile or spin-off games.

The Tomb Raider Trilogy
The Tomb Raider Trilogy is a collection of the three second era Tomb Raider games: Tomb Raider: Legend, Tomb Raider: Anniversary and Tomb Raider: Underworld. It was released in March 2011 in North America and Europe exclusively on PlayStation 3 as part of the Classics HD line. The games were originally developed by Crystal Dynamics, in association with Buzz Monkey Software and Nixxes Software BV, and were ported to the PS3 by Buzz Monkey Software.

The collection includes the PlayStation 2 versions of Legend and Anniversary remastered in high definition plus Underworld, which was previously released on the PS3 in 2008, all on one Blu-ray Disc. Also included is PlayStation Network Trophy support, bonus Lara Croft and Viking Thrall avatars for use in PlayStation Home, a theme pack for the XrossMediaBar and making-of videos.

The two downloadable episodes available for the Xbox 360 version of Underworld are not included. The Angel of Darkness, the first Tomb Raider game to be released on the PS2, is also not included in the collection as it was developed by Core Design rather than Crystal Dynamics and has no relation to the story told in Legend, Anniversary and Underworld.

Level Editor
The Tomb Raider Level Editor, Room Editor, is a tool released by Eidos Interactive with the video game Tomb Raider Chronicles in late 2000. Later, it was made available free to download from the Internet. Since then it has enabled players to design new levels of their own, set in locations from the original games or in new locations.

The Action Adventure
An interactive DVD was released by Bright Entertainment under license from Eidos in 2006, called Tomb Raider: The Action Adventure. The game takes advantage of standard DVD player audiovisual capabilities, and the remote control. It has puzzles and action elements, while the story is based on The Angel of Darkness.

Pachinko
 Tomb Raider (2006)
 CR Tomb Raider MF-TV (2007)
 CR Tomb Raider MR (2007)
 CR Tomb Raider XF-T (2007)

Films
There were initially two film adaptations made in the early 2000s that starred Angelina Jolie as Lara Croft in Lara Croft: Tomb Raider in 2001 and its sequel, The Cradle of Life, in 2003. While both films were financially successful, neither of them were well received by critics. A reboot starring Alicia Vikander as Lara Croft was released in 2018, which was better received. A sequel of the 2018 film was in development with Vikander returning as Croft but it was later canceled with the film rights reverted to the game company and prompted a bidding war among studios.

In 2015, Adrian Askarieh, producer of the Hitman films, stated that he hoped to oversee a shared universe of Square Enix films with Just Cause, Hitman, Tomb Raider, Deus Ex, and Thief, but admitted that he does not have the rights to Tomb Raider. Some reports such as the Game Central reporters at Metro UK commented that the shared universe was unlikely, pointing out that no progress had been made on any Just Cause, Deus Ex nor Thief films.

A short film called Tomb Raider: The Trilogy was produced in 1998 by Silver Films for the Tomb Raider III launch party. The film was not screened outside the event at the Natural History Museum in London. Producer Janey de Nordwall, who recently found the original digibeta tape, released the short film on the Tomb Raider YouTube page in 2016. Lara Croft makes a minor appearance in the 2018 film Ready Player One.

Lara Croft: Tomb Raider (2001)

Lara Croft: Tomb Raider – The Cradle of Life (2003)

Tomb Raider (2018)

Rumors of a third film adaptation appeared in 2007, and was announced in 2009. The film rights were acquired by GK Films in 2011, confirming its development four years later, with the involvement of Warner Bros. and MGM. The film is a reboot, showing Lara's first adventure and is based on the 2013 video game with Lara searching for her father. Alicia Vikander was cast as Lara Croft in the reboot. Walton Goggins was cast as the film's villain; he called the plot "Raiders of the Lost Ark meets a genre version of the Joseph Conrad novel Victory: An Island Tale". Daniel Wu was cast as Lu Ren, a ship captain who joins forces with the adventurous Lara Croft on her quest to find her father. The film was released on 16 March 2018. Filming began on 23 January 2017.

Untitled Amazon film
In January 2023, MGM sister company Amazon Studios secured the rights to a new Tomb Raider film, with Dmitri M. Johnson and his company dj2 Entertainment attached to produce. The film was intended to be interconnected with a television series from Phoebe Waller-Bridge and a video game from Crystal Dynamics, forming a Tomb Raider shared universe and franchise.

Television

Revisioned: Tomb Raider (2007)

In 2007, an animated series based on the character was produced and broadcast by GameTap as part of a series of re-imaginings of popular video game series. Titled Revisioned: Tomb Raider, the series voiced by Minnie Driver ran between May and June 2007. Multiple noted animators and writers were involved with the series, including Peter Chung, Warren Ellis, Gail Simone and Jim Lee. While the production team had great creative freedom, they were given a basic guideline for the character by the developers so that Lara would not do anything out of character.

Future television series 
In late January 2021, Netflix and Legendary Entertainment announced an anime-style series adaptation based on the franchise, with Tasha Huo as the showrunner and executive producer. The series will primarily take place after the events of its video game reboot trilogy. Hayley Atwell will voice Lara Croft in the anime series.  Earl Baylon who voiced Jonah Maiva from the Shadow of the Tomb Raider reprises his role. Allen Maldonado voices Lara's tech expert, Zip.

In late January 2023, The Hollywood Reporter reported that Phoebe Waller-Bridge was developing a Tomb Raider television series for Amazon Prime Video.

Reception

Box office performance

Critical and public response

Music

Soundtracks
Several soundtrack albums have been released over the course of the franchise's history. Initially, music from the game was only released on promotional samplers. However, the 2013 reboot and its 2015 sequel received full soundtrack releases. Additionally, there has been at least one album release for each of the three Tomb Raider films.

{| class="wikitable sortable"
|-
! Year
! Title
! Composer(s)
! Notes
|-
| 1999
| Tomb Raider: Toutes Les Musiques
| Nathan McCree
| Promotional release included with the French magazine Total Play, issue 14. Includes music from Tomb Raider, II and III.
|-
| rowspan="2" | 2001
| Lara Croft: Tomb Raider – Original Motion Picture Soundtrack
| Various artists
| 
|-
| Lara Croft: Tomb Raider – Original Motion Picture Score
| Graeme Revell
| 
|-
| rowspan="2" | 2003
| Lara Croft: Tomb Raider – The Cradle of Life (Original Motion Picture Soundtrack)
| Various artists
| 
|-
| Lara Croft: Tomb Raider – The Cradle of Life (Original Motion Picture Score)
| Alan Silvestri
| 
|-
| 2002/03
| Tomb Raider: The Angel of Darkness (Collector's Edition) Soundtrack
| Peter Connelly, Martin Iveson
| Promotional album released on a bonus DVD with Tomb Raider: The Angel of Darkness in 2002 and as a standalone CD album in 2003.
|-
| 2007
| Tomb Raider: Anniversary (Collector's Edition) Soundtrack
| Troels Brun Folmann
| Promotional album released with the Tomb Raider: Anniversary Collector's Edition, which includes music from Tomb Raider: Legend.
|-
| 2008
| Tomb Raider: Underworld (Limited Edition) Soundtrack
| Colin O'Malley
| Promotional album featured on Tomb Raider: Underworld'''s limited edition release.
|-
| 2013
| Tomb Raider – Original Soundtrack| Jason Graves
| 
|-
| 2015
| Rise of the Tomb Raider – Original Game Soundtrack| Bobby Tahouri
| 
|-
| 2017
| The Tomb Raider Suite| Nathan McCree
| Re-recording of material from Tomb Raider, Tomb Raider II and Tomb Raider III.
|-
| 2018
| Tomb Raider – Original Motion Picture Soundtrack| Tom Holkenborg
| Soundtrack album for the 2018 reboot film.
|-
| 2019
| Tomb Raider: The Dark Angel Symphony| Peter Connelly
| Re-recording of material from Tomb Raider: The Last Revelation, Tomb Raider Chronicles and Tomb Raider: The Angel of Darkness. Also includes the original music from those games.
|}

Comics

Beginning in 1997, Lara Croft was featured in multiple comics produced by Top Cow Productions. Her first appearance is a cameo in Witchblade. She later appeared in a titular comic book series which ran for fifty issues from 1999 to 2005. An attempt by Top Cow to restart the comic in 2007 stalled due to licensing issues. A new comic book series began in 2014, set within the 2013 reboot's continuity and bridging the narrative gap between the reboot and its sequel.

Novels
Six official novels have also been written. The first three, set within the original timeline, were published between 2003 and 2005. The first novel, The Amulet of Power, was set after the events of The Last Revelation, while its sequels The Lost Cult and The Man of Bronze are set after the first novel. Another novel set within the 2013 reboot timeline, Tomb Raider: The Ten Thousand Immortals, was published in 2014 as a continuation of the original story. A fifth book, titled Lara Croft and the Blade of Gwynnever, also written by Dan Abnett and Nik Vincent was published in late 2016, and is a stand-alone adventure. The sixth book, Path to Apocalypse, written by S. D. Perry and published in 2018, is a tie-in to the Shadow of the Tomb Raider game and is set between the Mexico and Peru parts of the game.

Canceled projects
Tomb Raider: Obsidian
Prior to the release of the first film, Alicia Vikander expressed interest in returning as Lara Croft for a second film. In April 2019, Amy Jump was hired to write a script for a possible sequel, with Vikander attached. In September, Ben Wheatley, Jump's husband, signed on to direct the sequel, that was planned for a 19 March 2021 release date and his long-time cinematographer Laurie Rose would also work on the sequel. In January 2021, Misha Green signed to replace Jump and Wheatley as writer and director. The film was planned to be released theatrically in the U.S. via the studio's distribution and marketing joint venture United Artists Releasing, and internationally through Warner Bros. Pictures. The first draft of the script was completed in May, with the working title Tomb Raider: Obsidian. In July 2022, MGM lost the film rights to the Tomb Raider'' franchise, after the window ran out to give the sequel the green light, culminating in Vikander's departure from the lead role. The rights reverted to the game company and prompted a bidding war among studios.

References

External links
 

Media
Tomb Raider
Tomb Raider